Kornos is a village located in the Larnaca District of Cyprus, 27 kilometres west of the city of Larnaca and 25 kilometres south-west of Nicosia.

References

Communities in Larnaca District